Polianka is a village and municipality in Myjava District in the Trenčín Region of north-western Slovakia.

History
In historical records the village was first mentioned in 1955.

Geography
The municipality lies at an altitude of 410 metres and covers an area of 9.419 km2. It has a population of about 356 people.

References

External links
 
 

Villages and municipalities in Myjava District